Rock en Español, Vol. 1 is an album by instrumental rock band Los Straitjackets consisting of Spanish language covers of classic 1950s and 1960s English language rock songs.  The band at the time of recording was Danny Amis on guitar, Eddie Angel on guitar and bass, Pete Curry on bass and guitar, and Jason Smay on drums and percussion.  The band recruited guest vocalists Big Sandy of Big Sandy & His Fly-Rite Boys, Cesar Rosas of Los Lobos, and Little Willie G. of Thee Midniters.

Track listing

1. "De Dia y de Noche" (2:20) - "All Day and All of the Night" (1964) by The Kinks 
 Lead vocals: Big Sandy
 Rhythm guitar: Pete Curry
 Lead guitar: Eddie Angel
 Bass: Danny Amis
 Background vocals: Los Cantantes Enmascarados

2. "Dejenme Llorar" (2:41) - by Los Freddy's (1973)
 Lead vocals, cowbell: Cesar Rosas

3. "Whittier Boulevard" (2:44) - by Thee Midniters (1965)
 Organ: Reverend Charles Williams

4. "Ana" (3:02) - "Anna (Go to Him)" (1962) by Arthur Alexander 
 Lead vocals: Little Willie G.
 Piano: Reverend Charles Williams
 Rhythm guitar: Pete Curry
 Acoustic guitar, vihuela: Cesar Rosas
 Background vocals:  Lonely Blue Boys

5. "El Microscopico Bikini" (2:51) - "Dizzy Miss Lizzy" (1958) by Larry Williams
 Lead vocals: Cesar Rosas

6. "Dame Una Seña" (2:38) - "Gimme Little Sign" (1967) by Brenton Wood
 Lead vocals: Big Sandy
 Background vocals, guitar, B3 organ: Cesar Rosas
 Additional organ: Pete Curry
 
7. "La Hiedra Venenosa" (3:12) - "Poison Ivy" (1959) by The Coasters
 Lead vocals: Big Sandy
 Background vocals: Cesar Rosas, Los Cantantes Enmascarados, Lonely Blue Boys

8. "Calor" (2:53) - "Slow Down" (1958) by Larry Williams
 Lead vocals: Big Sandy
 Piano: Pete Curry

9. "Hey Lupe" (3:19) - "Hang On Sloopy" (1965) by The McCoys
 Lead vocals, background vocals: Little Willy G.
 Background vocals:  Cesar Rosas, Los Cantantes Enmascarados, Lonely Blue Boys

10. "Lagrimas Solitarias" (2:49) - "Lonely Teardrops" (1958) by Jackie Wilson
 Lead vocals: Big Sandy
 Background vocals: Lonely Blue Boys

11. "Popotitos" (3:07) - "Bony Moronie" (1957) by Larry Williams
 Lead vocals: Cesar Rosas

12. "Magia Blanca" (3:37) - "Devil Woman" (1962) by Marty Robbins
 Lead vocals: Big Sandy
 Background vocals, acoustic guitar, ukulele: Cesar Rosas

13. "Loco Te Patina El Coco" (2:43) - "Wild Thing" (1966) by The Troggs
 Lead vocals: Little Willie G.
 
14. "Tu Te Vas" (3:03) - "You'll Lose a Good Thing" by Barbara Lynn (1962) and Freddy Fender (1976)
 Lead vocals: Big Sandy
 B3 organ, electric guitar, background vocals: Cesar Rosas

References

External links
 "Rock en Espanol, with Wrestling Masks", Fresh Air June 11, 2007 interview with Big Sandy and Los Straitjackets

2007 albums
Los Straitjackets albums
Rock en Español albums
Covers albums